Amiantofusus is a genus of sea snails, marine gastropod mollusks in the family Fasciolariidae, the spindle snails, the tulip snails and their allies.

Species
Species within the genus Amiantofusus include:
 Amiantofusus amiantus (Dall, 1889)
 Amiantofusus borbonica Fraussen, Kantor & Hadorn, 2007
 Amiantofusus candoris Fraussen, Kantor & Hadorn, 2007
 Amiantofusus cartilago Fraussen, Kantor & Hadorn, 2007
 Amiantofusus gloriabundus Fraussen, Kantor & Hadorn, 2007
 Amiantofusus maestratii Fraussen, Kantor & Hadorn, 2007
 Amiantofusus pacificus Fraussen, Kantor & Hadorn, 2007
 Amiantofusus sebalis Fraussen, Kantor & Hadorn, 2007

References

Fasciolariidae
Gastropod genera